Eunota circumpicta, the cream-edged tiger beetle, is a species of tiger beetle in the Cicindelidae family. The species is native to the United States. It was formerly known as Cicindela circumpicta and Habroscelimorpha circumpicta.

Description
The species color is green, blue, and brown or purple.

Ecology and habitat
The species prefer salty habitats such as flats. They are mostly active from June to mid-August.

References

Cicindelidae
Beetles described in 1841
Endemic fauna of the United States